The list of ship decommissionings in 1993 includes a chronological list of all ships decommissioned in 1993.


See also 

1993
 Ship decommissionings
Ship